Webster County School District may refer to:

 Webster County School District (Georgia)
 Webster County School District (Kentucky)
 Webster County School District (Mississippi)